Khotan may refer to:

Hotan, a city in Hotan Prefecture, Xinjiang, China
Hotan County, a county in Hotan Prefecture, Xinjiang, China
Hotan Prefecture, Xinjiang, China
Kingdom of Khotan, which flourished in the first millennium CE
Khotan Fernández, an actor commonly known simply as Khotan
Yutian County, Xinjiang, a county in Xinjiang, China